Michelle Katsvairo is a Zimbabwean footballer who currently plays for Township Rollers.

Having been a product of Zimbabwe's renowned Black Ace's Academy, he has already scored on two occasions in all competitions for the ''Amakhosi.

Club career
Back in Chicken Inn FC, he managed a total of 14 goals in 2015–16.
Joining from Chicken Inn F.C. in the summer, Katsvairo enhanced Kaizer Chiefs FC's striking options. He made his league debut for the club on 14 September 2016 in a 1–1 home draw with Platinum Stars F.C. He was subbed on for Lucky Baloyi in the 67th minute. He scored his first goal against Free State Stars to secure a 2–0 win. His goal came in the 63rd minute.

References

External links
Michelle Katsvairo at Flashscore
Michelle Katsvairo at Who Scored

Michelle Katsvairo at Footballdatabase

Zimbabwean footballers
Zimbabwean expatriate footballers
Living people
1990 births
Association football forwards
Zimbabwe international footballers
Black Mambas F.C. players
Gunners F.C. players
F.C. Platinum players
Chicken Inn F.C. players
Kaizer Chiefs F.C. players
Singida United F.C. players
CAPS United players
Free State Stars F.C. players
Ngezi Platinum F.C. players
Highlanders F.C. players
Township Rollers F.C. players
South African Premier Division players
Zimbabwean expatriate sportspeople in Tanzania
Zimbabwean expatriate sportspeople in South Africa
Zimbabwean expatriate sportspeople in Botswana
Expatriate footballers in Tanzania
Expatriate soccer players in South Africa
Expatriate footballers in Botswana
Tanzanian Premier League players